William Josephus Robinson (December 8, 1867 – January 6, 1936) was an American physician, sexologist and birth control advocate.  He was Chief of the department of Genito-Urinary Diseases at Bronx Hospital Dispensary, and editor of the American Journal of Urology and Sexology.  Robinson was active in the birth control movement in the United States.  He was "the first American physician to demand that contraceptive knowledge be taught to medical students and [...] probably the most influential and popular of the American physicians writing on birth control in the first three decades of the twentieth century".

As well as his own medical writings, Robinson edited the works of the pioneering pediatrician Abraham Jacobi. He was also a freethinking critic of Christianity.

Works

 (ed.) Dr. Jacobi's works. Collected essays, addresses, scientific papers and miscellaneous writings of A. Jacobi, 1909
 Never-told tales, 1909
 (with Leo Jacobi and others) Sex morality: past present and future, 1912. Online here. Reviewed by Horace Traubel, The Conservator 23:73 (July 1912).
 Sexual problems of today, 1912. Reviewed by Horace Traubel, The Conservator 23:139 (November 1912).
 'Walt Whitman and sex', The Conservator 24:53 (June 1913).
 A practical treatise on the causes, symptoms, and treatment of sexual impotence and other sexual disorders in men and women, 1913
 The treatment of gonorrhea and its complications in men and women, for the general practitioner, 1915
 Fewer and better babies, birth control; or, The limitation of offspring by prevenception, 1916
 Birth Control, or, The Limitation of Offspring, 1916, The Critic and Guide Co.
 Woman: her sex and love life, 1917
 Eugenics, Marriage and Birth Control: (Practical Eugenics), 1917
 Woman: Her sex and love life, 1929, Eugenics publishing.
 Sexual Truths versus Sexual Lies, Misconceptions, and Exaggerations, 1919, The American Biological Society.
 Married Life and Happiness, or, Love and Comfort in Marriage, 1922, Eugenics Publishing Co.
 A doctor's view on life, 1927. Edited by Eden and Cedar Paul.
 Sex, love and morality : a rational code of sexual ethics based upon the highest principle of morality--the principle of human happiness; the last word on the subject, 1928
 Practical prevenception; or, The technique of birth control; giving the latest methods of prevention of conception, discussing their effect, favorable or unfavorable, on the sex act; their indications and contra-indications, pointing out the reasons for failures and how to avoid them. For the medical profession only, 1929
 The oldest profession in the world; prostitution, its underlying causes, its treatment and its future, 1929
 If I were God: a freethinker's faith, incorporating a discussion between the author and a Catholic priest, New York: The Freethought Press Association, 1930. With an introduction by Harry Elmer Barnes. Online at the Internet Archive.
 Rosary of Lay Saints, New York: The Freethough Press Association, 1932
 Soviet Russia as I saw it; its crimes and stupidities, 1932
 Happiness and how to attain it, 1933
 Medical and sex dictionary, 1933
 The law against abortion; its perniciousness demonstrated and its repeal demanded, 1933
 Our mysterious life glands and how they affect us. A popular treatise on our glands and their secretions - what they do to us, how they affect our health, growth, appearance, temper, mentality, and character; including the vitamins, 1934

References

External links
 
 

1867 births
1936 deaths
American atheists
American birth control activists
American skeptics
American sexologists
American urologists
Critics of Christianity